Rafael Lopez Guzman is a Spanish catedratico and has a Phd in art history. He is an expert in mudejar art in Spain and Latin America. He is a professor in the Universidad de Granada, Spain.

Books
He has published several books and articles on mudejar art and colonial art in Spain and Mexico.  
"Tradición y Clasicismo en la Granada del siglo XVI: Arquitectura Civil y Urbanismo" . (Granada, Diputación,1987) 
"Arquitectura Mudéjar Granadina". (Granada, Caja de Ahorros,1990.) 
"Arquitectura y Carpintería Mudéjar en Nueva España." (México, Azabache, 1992) 
"Arquitectura Mudéjar: Del sincretismo medieval a las alternativas americanas" (Madrid, Cátedra, 2000).  
"Los Palacios del Renacimiento" (Granada, Diputación, 2005) 
"Territorio, poblamiento y arquitectura. México en las relaciones geográficas de Felipe II" (Granada, Universidad, 2007)

He has made several introductions to books of art such as Arquitectura imaginaria Al-Azrak: el Palacio Azul by León R. Zahar, Editorial Artes de México, 1999 (introductory note by Prof. Oleg Grabar). He also made a presentation for the book, Taracea islamica y mudejar, Editorial Artes de Mexico, 2000 by the same author and for the book Arte islamico, evocacion del Paraiso, El Colegio de Mexico, 2008 by the same author.

References

External links
Elcolegiodeméxico.com
artesdemexico.com

Year of birth missing (living people)
Living people
Spanish art historians
Academic staff of the University of Granada